Lauri Vihtori Kaijalainen (21 March 1900, Laukaa - 5 September 1965) was a Finnish journalist and politician. He served as Minister of Transport and Public Works from 26 March 1946 to 29 July 1948. He was a member of the Parliament of Finland from 1930 to 1948, representing the Agrarian League.

References

1900 births
1965 deaths
People from Laukaa
People from Vaasa Province (Grand Duchy of Finland)
Centre Party (Finland) politicians
Ministers of Transport and Public Works of Finland
Members of the Parliament of Finland (1930–33)
Members of the Parliament of Finland (1933–36)
Members of the Parliament of Finland (1936–39)
Members of the Parliament of Finland (1939–45)
Members of the Parliament of Finland (1945–48)
Finnish people of World War II
20th-century Finnish journalists